The 2000 African Futsal Championship took place in Cairo, Egypt from April 16 to April 21, 2000. The tournament served as a qualifying tournament for the 2000 FIFA Futsal World Cup in Guatemala.

Matches

Standings

Honors

External links 
Official Site
On RSSSF

2000 in Egyptian sport
2000
2000
African Futsal Championship, 2000
Futsal Championship
2000s in Cairo
Sports competitions in Cairo
April 2000 sports events in Africa